Robert Palmer Anderson (March 27, 1906 – May 2, 1978) was a United States circuit judge of the United States Court of Appeals for the Second Circuit and previously was a United States District Judge of the United States District Court for the District of Connecticut.

Education and career

Born on March 27, 1906, in the Village of Noank, Town of Groton, Connecticut, Anderson received a Bachelor of Arts degree in 1927 from Yale University and a Bachelor of Laws in 1929 from Yale Law School. He entered private practice in New London, Connecticut from 1929 to 1953. He served as a United States Commissioner of the United States District Court for the District of Connecticut in 1936. He was the Public Defender for New London County, Connecticut from 1936 to 1947. He was a member of the Connecticut State Bar Examining Committee from 1936 to 1954. He served in the United States Coast Guard Reserve from 1942 to 1945. He was the State's Attorney for New London County from 1947 to 1953. He was a member of the Connecticut Senate from 1947 to 1949. He served on the Judicial Council of the State of Connecticut from 1952 to 1953. He served as a Judge of the Connecticut Superior Court from 1953 to 1954. He was a Captain in the United States Coast Guard Reserve from 1955 to 1957.

Federal judicial service

Anderson was nominated by President Dwight D. Eisenhower on April 6, 1954, to a seat on the United States District Court for the District of Connecticut vacated by Judge Carroll C. Hincks. He was confirmed by the United States Senate on April 23, 1954, and received his commission on April 27, 1954. He served as Chief Judge from 1960 to 1964. His service terminated on August 20, 1964, due to elevation to the Second Circuit.

Anderson was nominated by President Lyndon B. Johnson on August 4, 1964, to a seat on the United States Court of Appeals for the Second Circuit vacated by Judge Charles Edward Clark. He was confirmed by the Senate on August 15, 1964, and received his commission on August 15, 1964. He assumed senior status on May 1, 1971. He served as a Judge of the Temporary Emergency Court of Appeals from 1972 to 1978. His service terminated on May 2, 1978, due to his death.

References

Sources

External links
 Robert P. Anderson Papers (MS 2035). Manuscripts and Archives, Yale University Library.

Judges of the United States District Court for the District of Connecticut
United States district court judges appointed by Dwight D. Eisenhower
Judges of the United States Court of Appeals for the Second Circuit
United States court of appeals judges appointed by Lyndon B. Johnson
20th-century American judges
1906 births
1978 deaths
Connecticut state court judges
People from Groton, Connecticut
Yale Law School alumni
Connecticut state senators
Public defenders
20th-century American politicians